Segersta is a locality situated in Bollnäs Municipality, Gävleborg County, Sweden with 313 inhabitants in 2010.

Segersta church has racines from the 13th century.

Segersta was filming location for The Girl with the Dragon Tattoo in September 2010.

References 

Populated places in Bollnäs Municipality
Hälsingland